Kolová is a municipality and village in Karlovy Vary District in the Karlovy Vary Region of the Czech Republic. It has about 800 inhabitants.

Administrative parts
The village of Háje is an administrative part of Kolová.

Gallery

References

Villages in Karlovy Vary District